A taste receptor or tastant is a type of cellular receptor which facilitates the sensation of taste. When food or other substances enter the mouth, molecules interact with saliva and are bound to taste receptors in the oral cavity and other locations. Molecules which give a sensation of taste are considered "sapid".

Vertebrate taste receptors are divided into two families:
 Type 1, sweet, first characterized in 2001:  – 
 Type 2, bitter, first characterized in 2000: In humans there are 25 known different bitter receptors, in cats there are 12, in chickens there are three, and in mice there are 35 known different bitter receptors.

Visual, olfactive, "sapictive" (the perception of tastes), trigeminal (hot, cool), mechanical, all contribute to the perception of taste. Of these, transient receptor potential cation channel subfamily V member 1 (TRPV1) vanilloid receptors are responsible for the perception of heat from some molecules such as capsaicin, and a CMR1 receptor is responsible for the perception of cold from molecules such as menthol, eucalyptol, and icilin.

Tissue distribution 

The gustatory system consists of taste receptor cells in taste buds. Taste buds, in turn, are contained in structures called papillae. There are three types of papillae involved in taste: fungiform papillae, foliate papillae, and circumvallate papillae. (The fourth type - filiform papillae do not contain taste buds). Beyond the papillae, taste receptors are also in the palate and early parts of the digestive system like the larynx and upper esophagus. There are three cranial nerves that innervate the tongue; the vagus nerve, glossopharyngeal nerve, and the facial nerve. The glossopharyngeal nerve and the chorda tympani branch of the facial nerve innervate the TAS1R and TAS2R taste receptors. Next to the taste receptors in on the tongue, the gut epithelium is also equipped with a subtle chemosensory system that communicates the sensory information to several effector systems involved in the regulation of appetite, immune responses, and gastrointestinal motility

In 2010, researchers found bitter receptors in lung tissue, which cause airways to relax when a bitter substance is encountered. They believe this mechanism is evolutionarily adaptive because it helps clear lung infections, but could also be exploited to treat asthma and chronic obstructive pulmonary disease.

The sweet taste receptor (T1R2/T1R3) can be found in various extra-oral organs throughout the human body such as the brain, heart, kidney, bladder, nasal respiratory epithelium and more. In most of the organs, the receptor function is unclear. The sweet taste receptor found in the gut and in the pancreas was found to play an important role in the metabolic regulation of the gut carbohydrate-sensing process and in insulin secretion. This receptor is also found in the bladder, suggesting that consumption of artificial sweeteners which activates this receptor might cause excessive bladder contraction.

Function 

Taste helps to identify toxins, maintain nutrition, and regulate appetite, immune responses, and gastrointestinal motility. Five basic tastes are recognized today: salty, sweet, bitter, sour, and umami. Salty and sour taste sensations are both detected through ion channels. Sweet, bitter, and umami tastes, however, are detected by way of G protein-coupled taste receptors.

In addition, some agents can function as taste modifiers, as miraculin or curculin for sweet or sterubin to mask bitter.

Mechanism of action 

The standard bitter, sweet, or umami taste receptor is a G protein-coupled receptor with seven transmembrane domains. Ligand binding at the taste receptors activate second messenger cascades to depolarize the taste cell. Gustducin is the most common taste Gα subunit, having a major role in TAS2R bitter taste reception. Gustducin is a homologue for transducin, a G-protein involved in vision transduction. Additionally, taste receptors share the use of the TRPM5 ion channel, as well as a phospholipase PLCβ2.

Savory or glutamates (Umami) 
The TAS1R1+TAS1R3 heterodimer receptor functions as an umami receptor, responding to L-amino acid binding, especially L-glutamate. The umami taste is most frequently associated with the food additive monosodium glutamate (MSG) and can be enhanced through the binding of inosine monophosphate (IMP) and guanosine monophosphate (GMP) molecules. TAS1R1+3 expressing cells are found mostly in the fungiform papillae at the tip and edges of the tongue and palate taste receptor cells in the roof of the mouth. These cells are shown to synapse upon the chorda tympani nerves to send their signals to the brain, although some activation of the glossopharyngeal nerve has been found.

Alternative candidate umami taste receptors include splice variants of metabotropic glutamate receptors, mGluR4 and mGluR1, and the NMDA receptor.

During the evolution of songbirds, the umami taste receptor has undergone structural modifications in the ligand binding site, enabling these birds to sense the sweet taste by this receptor.

Sweet 

The TAS1R2+TAS1R3 heterodimer receptor functions as the sweet receptor by binding to a wide variety of sugars and sugar substitutes. TAS1R2+3 expressing cells are found in circumvallate papillae and foliate papillae near the back of the tongue and palate taste receptor cells in the roof of the mouth. These cells are shown to synapse upon the chorda tympani and glossopharyngeal nerves to send their signals to the brain. The TAS1R3 homodimer also functions as a sweet receptor in much the same way as TAS1R2+3 but has decreased sensitivity to sweet substances. Natural sugars are more easily detected by the TAS1R3 receptor than sugar substitutes. This may help explain why sugar and artificial sweeteners have different tastes. Genetic polymorphisms in TAS1R3 partly explain the difference in sweet taste perception and sugar consumption between people of African American ancestry and people of European and Asian ancestries.

Sensing of the sweet taste has changed throughout the evolution of different animals. Mammals sense the sweet taste by transferring the signal through the heterodimer T1R2/T1R3, the sweet taste receptor. In birds, however, the T1R2 monomer does not exist and they sense the sweet taste through the heterodimer T1R1/T1R3, the umami taste receptor, which has gone through modifications during their evolution. A recently conducted study showed that along the evolution stages of songbirds, there was a decrease in the ability to sense the umami taste, and an increase in the ability to sense the sweet taste, whereas the primordial songbird parent could only sense the umami taste. Researchers found a possible explanation for this phenomenon to be a structural change in the ligand binding site of the umami receptor between the sweet taste sensing and non-sensing songbirds. It is assumed that a mutation in the binding site occurred over time, which allowed them to sense the sweet taste through the umami taste receptor.

Bitter
The TAS2R proteins function as bitter taste receptors. There are 43 human TAS2R genes, each of which (excluding the five pseudogenes) lacks introns and codes for a GPCR protein. These proteins, as opposed to TAS1R proteins, have short extracellular domains and are located in circumvallate papillae, palate, foliate papillae, and epiglottis taste buds, with reduced expression in fungiform papillae. Though it is certain that multiple TAS2Rs are expressed in one taste receptor cell, it is still debated whether mammals can distinguish between the tastes of different bitter ligands. Some overlap must occur, however, as there are far more bitter compounds than there are TAS2R genes. Common bitter ligands include cycloheximide, denatonium, PROP (6-n-propyl-2-thiouracil), PTC (phenylthiocarbamide), and β-glucopyranosides.

Signal transduction of bitter stimuli is accomplished via the α-subunit of gustducin. This G protein subunit activates a taste phosphodiesterase and decreases cyclic nucleotide levels. Further steps in the transduction pathway are still unknown. The βγ-subunit of gustducin also mediates taste by activating IP3 (inositol triphosphate) and DAG (diglyceride). These second messengers may open gated ion channels or may cause release of internal calcium. Though all TAS2Rs are located in gustducin-containing cells, knockout of gustducin does not completely abolish sensitivity to bitter compounds, suggesting a redundant mechanism for bitter tasting (unsurprising given that a bitter taste generally signals the presence of a toxin). One proposed mechanism for gustducin-independent bitter tasting is via ion channel interaction by specific bitter ligands, similar to the ion channel interaction which occurs in the tasting of sour and salty stimuli.

One of the best-researched TAS2R proteins is TAS2R38, which contributes to the tasting of both PROP and PTC. It is the first taste receptor whose polymorphisms are shown to be responsible for differences in taste perception. Current studies are focused on determining other such taste phenotype-determining polymorphisms. More recent studies show that genetic polymorphisms in other bitter taste receptor genes influence bitter taste perception of caffeine, quinine and denatonium benzoate.

It has been demonstrated that bitterness receptors (TAS2R) play an important role in an innate immune system of airway (nose and sinuses) ciliated epithelium tissues. 
This innate immune system adds an "active fortress" to the physical Immune system surface barrier.
This fixed immune system is activated by the binding of ligands to specific receptors.
These natural ligands are bacterial markers, for TAS2R38 example: acyl-homoserine lactones or quinolones produced by Pseudomonas aeruginosa. To defend against predators, some plants have produced mimic bacterial markers substances. These plant mimes are interpreted by the tongue, and the brain, as being bitterness.
The fixed immune system receptors are identical to the bitter taste receptors, TAS2R. Bitterness substances are agonist of TAS2R fixed immune system.

The innate immune system uses nitric oxide and defensins which are capable of destroying bacteria, and also viruses.
These fixed innate immune systems (Active Fortresses) are known in other epithelial tissues than upper airway (nose, sinuses, trachea, bronchi), for example: breast (mammary epithelial cells), gut and also human skin (keratinocytes)
Bitter molecules, their associated bitter taste receptors, and the sequences and homology models of bitter taste receptors, are available via BitterDB.

Sour 

Historically it was thought that the sour taste was produced solely when free hydrogen ions (H+) directly depolarised taste receptors. However, specific receptors for sour taste with other methods of action are now being proposed. The HCN channels were such a proposal; as they are cyclic nucleotide-gated channels. The two ion channels now suggested to contribute to sour taste are ASIC2 and TASK-1.

Salt 

Various receptors have also been proposed for salty tastes, along with the possible taste detection of lipids, complex carbohydrates, and water. Evidence for these receptors had been unconvincing in most mammal studies. For example, the proposed ENaC receptor for sodium detection can only be shown to contribute to sodium taste in Drosophila. However, proteolyzed forms of ENaC have been shown to function as a human salt taste receptor. Proteolysis is the process where a protein is cleaved. The mature form of ENaC is thought to be proteolyzed, however the characterization of which proteolyzed forms exist in which tissues is incomplete. Proteolysis of cells created to overexpress hetermulitmeric ENaC comprising alpha, beta and gamma subunits was used to identify compounds that selectively enhanced the activity of proteolyzed ENaC versus non-proteolyzed ENaC. Human sensory studies demonstrated that a compound that enhances proteolyzed ENaC functions to enhance the salty taste of table salt, or sodium chloride, confirming proteolyzed ENaC as the first human salt taste receptor.

Carbonation 

An enzyme connected to the sour receptor transmits information about carbonated water.

Fat
A possible taste receptor for fat, CD36, has been identified. CD36 has been localized to the circumvallate and foliate papillae, which are present in taste buds and where lingual lipase is produced, and research has shown that the CD36 receptor binds long chain fatty acids. Differences in the amount of CD36 expression in human subjects was associated with their ability to taste fats, creating a case for the receptor's relationship to fat tasting. Further research into the CD36 receptor could be useful in determining the existence of a true fat-tasting receptor.

GPR120 and GPR40 have been implicated to respond to oral fat, and their absence leads to reduced fat preference and reduced neuronal response to orally administered fatty acids.

TRPM5 has been shown to be involved in oral fat response and identified as a possible oral fat receptor, but recent evidence presents it as primarily a downstream actor.

Types 

Human bitter taste receptor genes are named TAS2R1 to TAS2R64, with many gaps due to non-existent genes, pseudogenes or proposed genes that have not been annotated to the most recent human genome assembly. Many bitter taste receptor genes also have confusing synonym names with several different gene names referring to the same gene. See table below for full list of human bitter taste receptor genes:

Loss of function 
In many species, taste receptors have shown loss of functions. The evolutionary process in which taste receptors lost their function is believed to be an adaptive evolution where it is associated with feeding ecology to drive specialization and bifurcation of taste receptors. Out of all the taste receptors, bitter, sweet, and umami are shown to have a correlation between inactivation of taste receptors and feeding behavior. However, there are no strong evidences that support any vertebrates are missing the bitter taste receptor genes.

The sweet taste receptor is one of the taste receptors where the function has been lost. In mammals, the predominant sweet taste receptor is the Type 1 taste receptor Tas1r2/Tas1r3. Some mammalian species such as cats and vampire bats have shown inability to taste sweet. In these species, the cause of loss of function of the sweet receptor is due to the pseudogenization of Tas1r2. The pseudogenization of Tas1r2 is also observed in non-mammalian species such as chickens and tongueless Western clawed frog, and these species also show the inability to taste sweet. The pseudogenization of Tas1r2 is widespread and independent in the order Carnivora. Many studies have shown that the pseudogenization of taste receptors is caused by a deleterious mutation in the open reading frames (ORF). In a study, it was found that in nonfeline carnivorous species, these species showed ORF-disrupting mutations of Tas1r2, and they occurred independently among the species. They also showed high variance in their lineages. It is hypothesized that the pseudogenization of Tas1r2 occurred through convergent evolution where carnivorous species lost their ability to taste sweet because of dietary behavior.

Umami is also a taste receptor where the function has been lost in many species. The predominant umami taste receptors are Tas1r1/Tas1r3. In two lineages of aquatic mammals including dolphins and sea lions, Tas1r1 has been found to be pseudogenized. The pseudogenization of Tas1r1 has also been found in terrestrial, carnivorous species. While the panda belongs to the order Carnivora, it is herbivorous where 99% of its diet is bamboo, and it cannot taste umami. Genome sequence of the panda shows that its Tas1r1 gene is pseudogenized. In a study, it was found that in all species in the order Carnivora except the panda, the open reading frame was maintained. In panda, the nonsynonymous to synonymous substitutions ratio was found to be much higher than other species in order Carnivora. This data correlates with fossil records date of the panda to show where panda switched from carnivore to herbivore diet. Therefore, the loss of function of umami in panda is hypothesized to be caused by dietary change where the panda became less dependence on meat. However, these studies do not explain herbivores such as horses and cows that have retained the Tas1r1 receptor.

Overall, the loss of function of the a taste receptor is an evolutionary process that occurred due to a dietary change in species.

References

External links 

 
 
 

G protein-coupled receptors
Gustation